Craig Perret (born February 2, 1951, in New Orleans, Louisiana) is an American thoroughbred horse racing jockey. He began riding horses at age five and by seven was riding quarter horses in match races. At age fifteen he began his career in thoroughbred racing and in 1967 was the leading apprentice jockey in the United States in terms of money won.

In 1987 Perret rode Bet Twice to victory in the Belmont Stakes. In 1990, aboard Unbridled, he won the Kentucky Derby, and in 1993-94 won back-to-back Queen's Plates, Canada's most prestigious race. In addition, Perret won the Breeders' Cup Sprint in 1984 and 1990; the Breeders' Cup Juvenile in 1989; and the Breeders' Cup Juvenile Fillies in 1996. Of his more than 4,400 career victories to date, he has also had major stakes race wins including the Florida Derby, Acorn Stakes, Pimlico Special, Travers Stakes, Haskell Invitational Handicap and the Wood Memorial Stakes.

He has earned a number of other accolades including the 1990 Eclipse Award for Outstanding Jockey of the year, and in 1998 his peers voted him the George Woolf Memorial Jockey Award.

Craig Perret and his family live on a farm in Shelbyville, Kentucky and operate a small full-breed breeding operation.

In 1994, Craig Perret was inducted into the Fair Grounds Racing Hall of Fame and in 2006 into the Louisiana Sports Hall of Fame. In 2006 he was also nominated for induction in the National Museum of Racing and Hall of Fame, and was officially inducted in 2019.

References

American jockeys
Cajun jockeys
American racehorse owners and breeders
Eclipse Award winners
Sportspeople from New Orleans
1951 births
Living people